Margaret Ray is the name of:
 Dixy Lee Ray (1914–1994), seventeenth governor of Washington State
 Margaret Mary Ray (1952–1998), stalker
 Margaret Ray (Australian politician) (1933–2017), Australian politician